Eden: It's an Endless World! is a science fiction manga by Japanese artist Hiroki Endo, published monthly in the Japanese magazine Monthly Afternoon. It is published in the United States by Dark Horse Comics, in the United Kingdom by Titan Books, and in Germany by Egmont Manga & Anime. Eden is set in the near future, following a pandemic called closure virus which killed 15 percent of the world's population, crippled or disfigured many more, and upset the world's political balance greatly. Eden is to some extent based on Gnostic mythology, with some characters, such as Ennoia, being named after Gnostic entities, and other Gnostic influences being seen in the themes of the ongoing story.

Plot 

The series begins with a long introduction, with the characters Ennoia and Hannah living a peaceful life on a remote and isolated island called Eden, with researcher Lane Morris, who is their guardian and a victim of the pandemic, the so-called "Closure Virus", which has killed 15% of mankind. The events that led to this situation are revealed in flashbacks, leading up to the return of Ennoia's father, along with the forces of the Propater Federation.

Following this, the story moves forwards twenty years, and focuses on Ennoia's son, Elijah, the main character, and his own conflict with the powerful and monopolistic Propater federation to save his sister, Mana Ballard, kidnapped by Propater when he was very young. She is being held to threaten Ennoia Ballard, father of the two characters, who has become a powerful drug lord in South America, feared and despised by many, including, to an extent, his own family. During a terrorist attack, Elijah, at the aged 15, is separated from his mother and his sister is kidnapped, along with his mother Hannah and now has to handle things on his own. Eden is about his coming-of-age as a man and trying to survive both bodily and morally in world that is too complex for mere "black and white". He encounters many other characters, both allies and enemies, all sharing the same struggle to survive in a post-apocalyptic dystopian world.

Many stories are included of the people Elijah meets, telling their past or following life, sometimes volumes later, furthering understanding of the characters and giving increased depth to the world of the book as a whole.

Later in the series, the story once again moves forwards in time, jumping four more years ahead. The Closure Virus, the cause of the original pandemic, mutates, this time assimilating non-organic matter as well as organic, known as "colloid" (or "Disclosure Virus"). The story rejoins Elijah, now 19 years old, as well as many other old characters, and some new, as the world begins to deal with this new threat that is swallowing many cities in the world, leaving lakes and craters, and many people.
It is later discovered that the several colloids in the world, are linked with a net of underground auto-built "cables," and that the colloid itself, stores all the memories of the people it swallows.

Characters 
Elijah Ballard
Elijah is introduced on the run from Propater. He encounters some mercenaries also eluding Propater and is forced to join them. During his flight he is forced to become a hardened killer. After returning to Peru, Elijah becomes involved in his father's criminal activities, and begins to walk the path of becoming an adult.
Ennoia Ballard
Elijah's father, raised on Eden. After he and Hannah left there, Ennoia became the most powerful drug lord in South America, and a staunch opponent of the Propater Federation.
Hannah Mayall
Elijah's mother, raised on Eden. She and Elijah's sister were captured by the Propater while trying to leave Ennoia with Elijah. A major focus of the series is Elijah's quest to rescue Hannah and Mana.
Mana Ballard
Elijah's sister, who remains in Propater hands whilst her mother is rescued. Elijah's fight to free her is a focus of the later parts of the story.
Colonel Khan
The Colonel is an old soldier from Azerbaijan, and the leader of the Nomad group (including Kenji and Sophia) fleeing Propater at the start of the series. Khan became Kenji's mentor after killing his brother, and the two share a slightly strained, but at the same time, trusting, relationship.
Sophia
A powerful Greek computer hacker, and full-body cyborg. Sophia has the appearance of a young girl, but is probably around 50 - 60 years old. Sophia is sort of a mother figure to many characters in the series, most notably Kenji, although her relationship with him is a little more complicated. Sophia was very promiscuous in her youth, and had eight children. Her first, Andreas, whom she tried to kill, and who still bears the scars, is a high-ranking member of Nomad. Sophia later helps to activate Maya.
Maya
An almost godlike AI, which seems to roughly correspond to the savior of Gnostic mythology. He has ability to connect human and colloid. Has the appearance of a rather androgynous, young dark-skinned boy.
Kenji
The brother of a low-level Yakuza boss, Kenji is extremely skilled at hand-to-hand combat. Kenji is even able to go hand-to-hand with the Aeons, dispatching countless numbers with only his signature knife. While he initially appears to be a sociopath, killing both soldiers and non-combatants without any signs of remorse, flashbacks in the fourth volume show him to be a psychologically complex character who is driven by basic human needs such as love and meaning.
Cherubim
A sophisticated robot built to protect the research facility on Eden, who was instead later used to destroy it. Cherubim later serves as Elijah's protector, and is a powerful combatant in his conflicts with Propater. However, Cherubim is not always able to distinguish friend from foe, and often causes collateral damage. Cherubim is named after a type of angel.
Helena Montoya
A prostitute now working in a brothel. Has a complex relationship with Elijah and acts as a surrogate big sister. She was forced to help the Colonel's merc group while on the run from Propater forcers in exchange for her freedom.

Reception 
Eden was named Wizard magazine's best manga of 2007. David F. Smith of Newtype USA has called Eden one of the best manga American money can buy.

References

External links
Eden: It's an Endless World! at Dark Horse Comics' official website
 

1997 manga
Artificial intelligence in fiction
Artificial wormholes in fiction
Biorobotics in fiction
Brain–computer interfacing in fiction
Cyberpunk anime and manga
Dark Horse Comics titles
Fiction about consciousness transfer
Kodansha manga
Nanotechnology in fiction
Political thriller anime and manga
Post-apocalyptic anime and manga
Prosthetics in fiction
Religion in science fiction
Seinen manga